Himanshu Rai is an Indian television actor. He is doing a show called Mere Sai - Shraddha Aur Saburi and playing prominent character 'Keshav Kulkarni' .

Early life and education
Himanshu Rai was born in the Sherpur, Ghazipur. He got his early education at Saraswati Shishu Mandir Dharanagar, Mohammadabad & Inter College Mohammadabad in Ghazipur, Uttar Pradesh, and completed his graduation from Veer Bahadur Singh Purvanchal University. He moved to Mumbai to pursue his career as an actor.

See also
List of Indian television actors

Television

References

External links 
 

Living people
1995 births
Indian male television actors
21st-century Indian male actors